The Tandy Memorex Video Information System (VIS) is an interactive, multimedia CD-ROM player produced by the Tandy Corporation starting in 1992. It is similar in function to the Philips CD-i and Commodore CDTV systems (particularly the CDTV, since both the VIS and CDTV were adaptations of existing computer platforms and operating systems to the set-top-box design). The VIS systems were sold only at Radio Shack, under the Memorex brand, both of which Tandy owned at the time.

Modular Windows 

Modular Windows is a special version of Microsoft Windows 3.1, designed to run on the Tandy Video Information System. Microsoft intended Modular Windows to be an embedded operating system for various devices, especially those designed to be connected to televisions. However, the VIS is the only known product that actually used this Windows version. It has been claimed that Microsoft created a new, incompatible version of Modular Windows ("1.1") shortly after the VIS shipped. No products are known to have actually used Modular Windows 1.1.

Reception 
The VIS was not a successful product; by some reports Radio Shack only sold 11,000 units during the lifetime of the product. Radio Shack store employees jokingly referred to the VIS as "Virtually Impossible to Sell". Tandy discontinued the product in early 1994 and all remaining units were sold to a liquidator.

Spinoffs 
 While Modular Windows was discontinued, other modular, embedded versions of Windows were later released. These include Windows CE and Windows XP Embedded.
 VIS applications could be written using tools and techniques similar to those used to write software for IBM PC compatible personal computers running Microsoft Windows.  This concept was carried forward in the Microsoft Xbox.

Specifications 
Details of the system include:
 CPU: Intel 286
 Video System: Cirrus Logic
 Sound System: Yamaha
 Chipset: NCR Corporation
 CDROM ×2 IDE by Mitsumi
 OS: Microsoft Modular Windows

Additional details:
 Intel 80286 processor on a local bus (not ISA) running at 12 MHz. 0-wait states.  Equivalent PC performance somewhere around that of a 386SX at 16 or 20 MHz.
 1 MB of ROM containing minimal MS-DOS 3.x, a few drivers, and Modular Windows.
 Built-in Audio CD player application.
 1 MB of RAM in a conventional PC layout 640 KB + 384 KB.
 Mitsumi 1× (150 KB/s) CD-ROM drive with 16-bit interface, 800 ms access, 1300 ms worst case access, CD+G capable, but not Photo-CD. 5000 hour MTBF.
 IR interface with up to two IR transmitters (hand controllers) operating at once.
 PS/2 mouse or keyboard interface (either can be connected and are generally recognized by applications).  A wired hand controller could also be connected to this port for use in locations where the wireless controller was not practical, or could be used in conjunction with one wireless controller.
 Expansion compartment for RS-232 serial board for use with Windows debugger.
 Modem (the same modem card that went in the Tandy Sensation I) could also be installed in the VIS.  2400 data 4800 send-only FAX.
 Outputs: RCA Line left/right, composite video, RF video, S-Video.  NTSC video.
 Dallas Semiconductor plug-in CyberCard - removable non-volatile storage, in sizes up to 512 KB and system comes with a 32 KB unit.
 Onboard audio is same as Tandy Sensation I: Adlib Gold compatible, not Sound Blaster compatible.
 Video uses ADAC-1 chip as found in Tandy Sensation I, supports YUV and several high-quality color modes.  Also supported some TV-specific features for handling overscan.

Software

Games

Multimedia

References 

CD-ROM-based consoles
Computer-related introductions in 1992
Embedded operating systems
Fourth-generation video game consoles
Home video game consoles
Products introduced in 1992
RadioShack
x86-based game consoles
1990s toys
New media
Multimedia